Josef Strobl is an Austrian geographer. He is a professor at the University of Salzburg and leads its Centre for Geoinformatics and the GIScience Institute. Strobl was key to the implementation of the worldwide UNIGIS postgraduate distance learning programme. He leads the annual AGIT and GI_Forum symposia in Salzburg.

Education
Habilitation, Geography, University of Salzburg, Salzburg, Austria, 1993
Doctor of Science (Dr.rer.nat.), Geography, University of Vienna, Austria, 1984
Master of Science (Mag.rer.nat.), Geography, University of Vienna, Austria, 1982

References

Austrian geographers
Living people
Place of birth missing (living people)
Academic staff of the University of Salzburg
Year of birth missing (living people)
Geographic information scientists